Christine Allsopp is an Anglican priest and was Archdeacon of Northampton from 2005 - 2013.

Born on 19 January 1947 she was educated at St Albans Grammar School for Girls and the University of Aston. A former research chemist, she was ordained deacon in 1989 and priest in 1994. After a curacy at Caversham she was Vicar of Bracknell and then Rural Dean of Alderbury before her collation as Archdeacon.

She retired in September, 2013

Notes

1947 births
Alumni of Aston University
Archdeacons of Northampton
Living people
People educated at St Albans School, Hertfordshire
Women Anglican clergy